Andrew Boyd (30 January 1910 – 10 January 2002) was an American fencer. He competed in the team épée events at the 1936 and 1948 Summer Olympics.

References

External links
 

1910 births
2002 deaths
American male épée fencers
Olympic fencers of the United States
Fencers at the 1936 Summer Olympics
Fencers at the 1948 Summer Olympics
Sportspeople from New York City